William Thayer may refer to:

William Greenough Thayer (1863–1934), American educator

W. Paul Thayer (1919–2010), American test pilot, aviation executive, and Deputy Secretary of Defense during the Reagan Administration
William Roscoe Thayer (1859–1923), American author and editor
William Sydney Thayer (consul) (died 1864), American Consul General to Egypt (1861–1864) - see United States Ambassador to Egypt
William Sydney Thayer (1864–1932), American physician and professor of medicine
W. W. Thayer (William Wallace Thayer, 1827–1899), American politician, governor of Oregon, and Oregon Supreme Court chief justice
William Wilde Thayer, one of the founders of the short-lived Thayer & Eldridge publishing firm (c. 1860–1861)
William Withington Thayer (1809-1881), American Congregational minister and missionary
William Thayer Arteaga (1918–2018), Chilean politician